A list of Portuguese films that were first released in 2013.

See also
2013 in Portugal

References

2013
Lists of 2013 films by country or language
2013 in Portugal